The title of Princess of Conti was a French noble title, held by the wife of the Prince of Conti between 1582 and 1803 with an intermission between 1614 and 1654.

Princesses of Conti

First Creation

Second Creation

Notes 

 
House of Bourbon-Conti
French princesses
Lists of princesses
1582 establishments in France